During the 2016–17 season, PSV Eindhoven participated in the Dutch Eredivisie, the KNVB Cup, the Johan Cruyff Shield and the UEFA Champions League.

Squad

Friendlies

Competitions

Johan Cruyff Shield

Eredivisie

League table

Results summary

Matches

KNVB Cup

UEFA Champions League

Group stage

Statistics

Appearances and goals

|-

|}

Disciplinary record

Transfers

Transfers in

Transfers out

Loans in

Loans out

References

PSV Eindhoven seasons
PSV Eindhoven
PSV Eindhoven